Karina Tyma (born 5 May 2000 in Gorzów Wielkopolski) is a Polish professional squash player. As of April 2021, she was ranked number 88 in the world. She won the European U19 Individual Championships 2019 and the 2021 Texas Open. She won 5 national titles in 2017, 2019, 2020, 2021, 2022 Tyma is enrolled at Drexel University in the United States and plays for Drexel Dragons Women Squash. In June 2021 she won her second PSA title by winning Life Time City Center Open 2021 in Houston.

References

2000 births
Living people
Polish female squash players
21st-century Polish women
Competitors at the 2022 World Games